Alfredo Baquerizo Moreno is a town located in Guayas province in Ecuador. It lies along the boundary between Guayas and Los Ríos provinces. Its official name was given in honor of Alfredo Baquerizo Moreno (1859 – 1951), who served three times as the president of Ecuador.  It is also known as Juján, a name is taken from a local tree. It was founded in 1892 by José Domingo Delgado (1844–1938).

The official population estimate as of 1995 was 7,301 and as of 2009 its population is calculated to be 17,512. It is the seat of the Alfredo Baquerizo Moreno canton (also known as Juján), which was created in 1986.

See also
Puerto Baquerizo Moreno

References 

Populated places in Guayas Province